Leonidas Merritt (February 20, 1844 – August 9, 1926) was an American politician and businessman.

Merriitt was born in Chautauqua County, New York. He moved to Minnesota and 1856 and settled in Oneota (Duluth) which was annexed to Duluth, Minnesota. Merritt was involved in the railroad, banking, and mining businesses. Merritt served in the Minnesota Calvary Company B during the American Civil War. He served on the West Duluth, Minnesota Village Council and as the Duluth, Minnesota Commissioner of Finance from 1921 to 1925. Merritt served in the Minnesota House of Representatives in 1893 and 1894 and was a Republican. His great-nephew Brian Merritt Bergson also served in the Minnesota Legislature.

References

1844 births
1926 deaths
People from Chautauqua County, New York
Politicians from Duluth, Minnesota
Businesspeople from Minnesota
People of Minnesota in the American Civil War
Republican Party members of the Minnesota House of Representatives